Trollenäs Castle is a castle in Eslöv Municipality, Scania, in southern Sweden. It dates from the 14th century, and has been in the ownership of only two families, Thott and Trolle. The current building goes back to 1559 and was in the late 19th century renovated by architect Ferdinand Meldahl to resemble a French Renaissance castle.

The castle is open to the public, offering facilities for weddings, conferences, dinners and other festivities. In the park there is a café.

External links 
 Trollenäs slott 

Castles in Skåne County